Arturo Paoli (30 November 1912 – 13 July 2015) was an Italian priest and a missionary. He was a member of the congregation of the Little Brothers of the Gospel. Paoli helped save Jewish Italians during World War II. He was born in Lucca, Italy.

Paoli died of natural causes in Lucca, Italy, aged 102.

References

External links

Il Fondo Documentazione Arturo Paoli aperto presso la sede della Fondazione Banca Del Monte di Lucca 
Piccoli Fratelli del Vangelo - Fraternità di Spello
 Servizio su Rai 3

1912 births
2015 deaths
Italian centenarians
Men centenarians
20th-century Italian Roman Catholic priests
People from Lucca